Robbie Tarrant (born 25 April 1989) is a professional Australian rules footballer playing for the Richmond Football Club in the Australian Football League (AFL), having previously played for the North Melbourne Football Club. He is the younger brother of former  and  player, Chris Tarrant.

Early career 
Tarrant was born in Mildura, Victoria and is the younger brother of former Collingwood defender Chris Tarrant. Tarrant originally played for South Mildura in the Sunraysia Football League and moved to Melbourne in 2005. After graduating from Xavier College in 2006, in 2007 he worked as a teller at Bendigo Bank in Bendigo as well as playing for the Bendigo Pioneers.

AFL career
Tarrant was drafted by the Kangaroos Football Club with their first selection and fifteenth overall in the 2007 national draft. He did not play any senior football in his first two years and he ultimately made his AFL debut in the thirty point loss against  at the Sydney Cricket Ground in round 15, 2010.

Tarrant's 2016 season was rewarded with the Syd Barker Medal as the club best and fairest.

He was ultimately traded on 8 October.

Statistics
Updated to the end of 2022 season..

|-
| 2010 ||  || 25
| 2 || 0 || 0 || 8 || 7 || 15 || 4 || 3 || 0.0 || 0.0 || 4.0 || 3.5 || 7.5 || 2.0 || 1.5 || 0
|-
| 2011 ||  || 25
| 7 || 1 || 1 || 52 || 24 || 76 || 21 || 19 || 0.1 || 0.1 || 7.4 || 3.4 || 10.9 || 3.0 || 2.7 || 0
|-
| 2012 ||  || 25
| 16 || 23 || 16 || 112 || 55 || 167 || 57 || 24 || 1.4 || 1.0 || 7.0 || 3.4 || 10.4 || 3.6 || 1.5 || 0
|-
| 2013 ||  || 25
| 13 || 16 || 15 || 78 || 54 || 132 || 58 || 15 || 1.2 || 1.2 || 6.0 || 4.2 || 10.2 || 4.5 || 1.2 || 0
|-
| 2014 ||  || 25
| 1 || 0 || 0 || 1 || 2 || 3 || 1 || 1 || 0.0 || 0.0 || 1.0 || 2.0 || 3.0 || 1.0 || 1.0 || 0
|-
| 2015 ||  || 25
| 22 || 1 || 0 || 192 || 126 || 318 || 113 || 35 || 0.0 || 0.0 || 8.7 || 5.7 || 14.5 || 5.1 || 1.6 || 0
|-
| 2016 ||  || 25
| 23 || 0 || 1 || 246 || 128 || 374 || 145 || 43 || 0.0 || 0.0 || 10.7 || 5.6 || 16.3 || 6.3 || 1.9 || 1
|-
| 2017 ||  || 25
| 21 || 1 || 1 || 229 || 144 || 373 || 131 || 55 || 0.0 || 0.0 || 10.9 || 6.9 || 17.8 || 6.2 || 2.6 || 0
|-
| 2018 ||  || 25
| 21 || 1 || 1 || 225 || 115 || 340 || 130 || 35 || 0.0 || 0.0 || 10.7 || 5.5 || 16.2 || 6.2 || 1.7 || 2
|-
| 2019 ||  || 25
| 22 || 1 || 0 || 231 || 116 || 347 || 137 || 37 || 0.0 || 0.0 || 10.5 || 5.3 || 15.8 || 6.2 || 1.7 || 2
|-
| 2020 ||  || 25
| 16 || 0 || 0 || 178 || 72 || 250 || 68 || 21 || 0.0 || 0.0 || 11.1 || 4.5 || 15.6 || 4.3 || 1.3 || 0
|-
| 2021 ||  || 25
| 10 || 0 || 0 || 104 || 41 || 145 || 67 || 10 || 0.0 || 0.0 || 10.4 || 4.1 || 14.5 || 6.7 || 1.0 || 0
|-
| 2022 ||  || 6
| 20 || 0 || 0 || 115 || 82 || 197 || 89 || 21 || 0.0 || 0.0 || 5.8 || 4.1 || 9.9 || 4.5 || 1.1 || 0
|- class="sortbottom"
! colspan=3| Career
! 194
! 44
! 35
! 1771
! 966
! 2737
! 1021
! 319
! 0.2
! 0.2
! 9.1
! 5.0
! 14.1
! 5.3
! 1.6
! 5
|}

References

External links 

Australian rules footballers from Victoria (Australia)
People from Mildura
1989 births
Living people
North Melbourne Football Club players
People educated at Xavier College
Bendigo Pioneers players
Syd Barker Medal winners
Australia international rules football team players